James Allan may refer to:

Sports
James Allan (Australian footballer) (born 1985), Australian rules footballer
James Allan (cricketer) (born 1972), New Zealand cricketer
James Allan (footballer, born 1857) (1857–1911), Scottish schoolmaster and footballer, founder of Sunderland A.F.C.
James Allan (footballer, born 1866) (1866–1945), Scottish international footballer (also known as John Allan)
James Allan (rugby union) (1860–1934), New Zealand rugby union player
Jock Allan , Scottish footballer

Others
James Alexander Allan (1879–1967), Australian poet
James Allan (diplomat) (1932–2018), British diplomat
James Allan (musician) (born 1979), lead singer and guitarist and former footballer
James Allan (Canadian politician) (1894–1992), Ontario politician
James Allan (bishop) (1928–2013), retired Canadian Anglican bishop
James Allan (computer scientist), University of Massachusetts Amherst professor
James Allan (law professor) (born 1960), Canadian-Australian law professor
James Allan (Queensland politician) (1856–1938), Queensland draper and state politician
James Allan Jr. (1845–1932), Wisconsin politician
James McGrigor Allan (1827–1916), British anthropologist and writer

See also
James Allen (disambiguation)
Jim Allan (disambiguation)
Jimmy Allan (disambiguation)